Kathy Beauregard is the former director of athletics for Western Michigan University. She previously served as an associate athletic director at Western Michigan University from 1989 to 1997, and as women's gymnastics head coach at Western Michigan University from 1980 to 1988. Beauregard graduated from Hope College with a bachelor's degree in 1979, and from Western Michigan University with a master's degree in 1981. Beauregard's hiring of football coach P. J. Fleck in 2013 propelled the Broncos football team to its greatest successes in program history, culminating in a 13–1 record in 2016 and berth in the 2017 Cotton Bowl. Beauregard retired as athletic director at Western Michigan on December 31, 2021.

Head coaching record

References

External links
 
 Western Michigan profile

1957 births
Living people
Western Michigan Broncos athletic directors
Hope College alumni
Western Michigan University alumni
Western Michigan Broncos coaches
College women's gymnastics coaches in the United States
People from Kalamazoo, Michigan
Women college athletic directors in the United States